Nicholas Lima (born November 17, 1994) is an American professional soccer player who plays as a defender for Major League Soccer club Austin FC.

Career

College and amateur
Lima played four years of college soccer at the University of California, Berkeley between 2013 and 2016. While at college, Lima also appeared for USL PDL side Burlingame Dragons.

Professional
On December 21, 2016, Lima signed as a Homegrown Player for Major League Soccer side San Jose Earthquakes. He made his professional debut on March 4, 2017, starting in a 1–0 win over Montreal Impact. His first professional goal was scored on March 11, 2017, in a 3–2 home victory against Vancouver Whitecaps FC. It was the first goal scored by a Homegrown player in Earthquakes history. On October 14, 2017, he was announced as a nominee for two different league awards: the MLS Defender of the Year Award alongside teammate Florian Jungwirth, and the MLS Rookie of the Year Award, along with teammate Jackson Yueill.

On December 13, 2020, Lima was traded to Austin FC in exchange for $500,000 of General Allocation Money.

International
Born in the United States, Lima is of Mexican descent. On January 8, 2018, he received a call-up for the United States men's national soccer team for a friendly against Bosnia and Herzegovina on January 28. He was named to the bench for the match, but ultimately did not take the field during the 0–0 draw. He made his debut on January 27, 2019 in a friendly against Panama, as a starter. Lima played the full 90, recorded an assist, and was named Man of the Match in his International debut.

Statistics

Club

International 
As of October 15, 2019

Source: US Soccer

References

External links

1994 births
Living people
American soccer players
American sportspeople of Mexican descent
Association football defenders
Austin FC players
Burlingame Dragons FC players
California Golden Bears men's soccer players
Homegrown Players (MLS)
Major League Soccer players
People from Castro Valley, California
San Jose Earthquakes players
Soccer players from California
Sportspeople from Castro Valley, California
United States men's international soccer players
USL League Two players
2019 CONCACAF Gold Cup players